Blues from Laurel Canyon is a 1968 album by John Mayall, featuring British blues music. It was his first album after the breakup of his band the Bluesbreakers in May 1968, though others claim it was on 14 July 1968. It was also his last album with Decca before moving to Polydor.

Background 
John Mayall sings and plays harmonica, organ and guitar on the album. The other band members are a young Mick Taylor (guitar), Colin Allen (drums) and Stephen Thompson (bass). The guitarist Peter Green is featured on the track "First Time Alone". The engineer was Derek Varnals. All the songs on the album were written by Mayall.

The title of the album derives from Laurel Canyon, California, United States (in the Los Angeles area) where John Mayall subsequently lived from 1969 to 1979. It forms a record of his visit there before moving to the US on a more permanent basis. The area was favoured by many musicians at the time. It was recorded at Decca Studios in West Hampstead, London, England between 26 and 28 August 1968, and was released on the Decca label. The album peaked at number 33 in the UK Albums Chart.

A remastered and expanded version of this album was released in the UK in August 2007.

Track listing 
All songs written by John Mayall — timings included.

Original tracks
 "Vacation" – 2:47
 "Walking on Sunset" – 2:50
 "Laurel Canyon Home" – 4:33
 "2401" – 3:42
 "Ready to Ride" – 3:32
 "Medicine Man" – 2:43
 "Somebody's Acting Like a Child" – 3:27
 "The Bear" – 4:40
 "Miss James" – 2:30
 "First Time Alone" – 4:49
 "Long Gone Midnight" – 3:27
 "Fly Tomorrow" – 9:00

Bonus tracks
 "2401" – 3:56 (Single version)
 "Wish You Were Mine" – 8:36 (Live '68, previously on Primal Solos)

Personnel 
 John Mayall – guitar, harmonica, keyboards, vocals, artwork, design
 Mick Taylor – guitar, pedal steel guitar
 Colin Allen – drums, tabla
 Steve Thompson – bass guitar
 Peter Green – guitar on "First Time Alone"
Technical
Derek Varnals - engineer
Adrian Martins - assistant engineer
Dominique Tarlé, Stephen C. LaVere, Rob Bosboom - photography

References

External links 
 Austin Chronicle groupie book article

1968 albums
John Mayall albums
Decca Records albums
Laurel Canyon, Los Angeles
London Records albums
Albums produced by John Mayall
Albums produced by Mike Vernon (record producer)